is a Japanese athlete. He competed in the men's long jump at the 1988 Summer Olympics. He is currently the track coach of Rakunan High School in Kyoto, where he coached Olympian Yoshihide Kiryū, the first Japanese to break the 10-second barrier.

References

1963 births
Living people
Place of birth missing (living people)
Japanese athletics coaches
Japanese male long jumpers
Olympic male long jumpers
Olympic athletes of Japan
Athletes (track and field) at the 1988 Summer Olympics
Japan Championships in Athletics winners